Goudiry Department is one of the 45 departments of Senegal, one of four making up the Tambacounda Region. It was created by decree in 2008.

The department has two urban communes; Goudiry and Kothiary.

The rest of the department is divided administratively into four arrondissements which are in turn divided into rural communities (communautés rurales).

Bala Arrondissement:
 Bala
 Koar
 Goumbayel
Boynguel Bamba Arrondissement:
 Boynguel Bamba
 Sinthiou Mamadou Boubou
 Koussan
 Dougué
Dianké Makha Arrondissement: 
 Dianké Makha
 Boutoucoufara
 Bani Israël
 Komoti
Koulor Arrondissement:
 Koulor
 Sinthiou Bocar Ali

References

Departments of Senegal
Tambacounda Region